Amar Cekić (born 21 December 1992) is a German and Bosnian footballer who plays for SGV Freiberg.

Club career
Born in Munich, Cekić played the majority of his career in the German lower leagues.

Honours
Regionalliga Bayern: 2019–21

References

External links
Profile at Kickersarchiv

1992 births
Living people
Footballers from Munich
Association football midfielders
German footballers
Bosnia and Herzegovina footballers
FK Kozara Gradiška players
FC Unterföhring players
Stuttgarter Kickers II players
Stuttgarter Kickers players
Rot-Weiss Essen players
FC Memmingen players
FC Pipinsried players
1. FC Schweinfurt 05 players
SGV Freiberg players
3. Liga players
First League of the Republika Srpska players
Regionalliga players
Oberliga (football) players